Gabriel Arroyo (born 3 March 1977) is an Argentine volleyball player. He competed in the men's tournament at the 2012 Summer Olympics.

References

External links
 

1977 births
Living people
Argentine men's volleyball players
Olympic volleyball players of Argentina
Volleyball players at the 2012 Summer Olympics
Volleyball players from Buenos Aires